Wadachiwadi is a village in the Karmala taluka of Solapur district in Maharashtra state, India.

Demographics
Covering  and comprising 143 households at the time of the 2011 census of India, Wadachiwadi had a population of 679. There were 365 males and 314 females, with 83 people being aged six or younger.

References

Villages in Karmala taluka